The Young Artist Award for Best Performance by a Leading Young Actress in a Feature Film is one of the Young Artist Awards presented annually by the Young Artist Association to recognize a young actress under the age of 21, who has delivered an outstanding performance in a leading role while working within the film industry. In its early years, the award was also known as the Youth in Film Award for Best Young Actress Starring in a Motion Picture, as well as by numerous other variations to its title over the years, however, the spirit of the award has remained essentially the same since its inception.  Winners are selected by secret ballot of the 125 members of the Young Artist Association as well as former Youth in Film Award/Young Artist Award winners.

History
Throughout the past 34 years, accounting for ties, category splits, and repeat winners, the Young Artist Association has presented a total of 44 "Best Leading Young Actress in a Feature Film" awards to 40 different actresses.  Winners of the award receive the traditional Young Artist Award statuette; a gilded figure of a man displaying a star above its head, reminiscent of a miniature child-sized Oscar.  The first recipient was Diane Lane, who was honored at the 1st Youth in Film Awards ceremony (1979) for her performance in A Little Romance.  The most recent recipients are Kathryn Newton and Quvenzhané Wallis who tied at the 34th Young Artist Awards for their toles in Paranormal Activity 4 and Beasts of the Southern Wild respectively.

Throughout the history of the award, the "Best Young Actress in a Feature Film" category has been "split" several times.  Until the 3rd Youth in Film Awards ceremony (1981), nominations for the "Best Young Actress in a Feature Film" award included all actresses, regardless of whether the performance could be perceived to be in either a leading or supporting role. At the 4th Youth in Film Awards ceremony (1982), however, the "Best Supporting Young Actress in a Feature Film" category (not listed on this page) was specifically introduced as a separate award.

In the late 1980s, the category was split for three ceremonies; the 9th Youth In Film Awards ceremony (1987), the 10th Youth in Film Awards ceremony (1988), and the 15th Youth in Film Awards ceremony (1993).  During these three years, the Young Artist Association split the category into a total of four sub-categories; "Best Young Female Superstar in a Motion Picture", "Best Young Actress in a Motion Picture: Drama", "Best Young Actress in a Motion Picture: Comedy or Fantasy", and "Best Young Actress in a Motion Picture: Horror or Mystery" (all listed on this page).  However, the association would once again "merge" these various sub-categories back together after the 15th Youth in Film Awards.

Beginning with the 14th Youth in Film Awards, the association once again split the category, this time creating a new category to recognize young film actresses age 10 and under in their own separate category.  The "Best Young Actress Age 10 and Under in a Feature Film" category (not listed on this page) would become a permanent fixture of the Young Artist Awards and, as of 2012, is still awarded annually.  Despite the creation of the "10 and Under" category, some "leading" young actresses under the age of 10 have continued to be nominated as "Best Leading Young Actress in a Feature Film".

Superlatives
Although today the Young Artist Association has strict age requirements regarding which nominees are eligible for a Young Artist Award nomination, the association did not originally have such specific age restrictions.  Today, candidates eligible for a Young Artist Award nomination must be between the ages of 5 and 21 at the time of principal production of the project for which they are nominated.  However, the eldest winner of the "Best Young Actress in a Feature Film" award is Lea Thompson, who was 26 years old the night she won for her performance in Some Kind of Wonderful at the 9th Youth in Film Awards ceremony (1987).  The youngest winner of a "Best Leading Young Actress in a Feature Film" award is Robin Weisman, who was 6 years old the night she won for her performance in Three Men and a Little Lady at the 12th Youth in Film Awards ceremony (1990).

The following list of superlatives is of winners/nominees in the "Best Leading Young Actress in a Feature Film" category. Wins/nominations in other Young Artist Award feature film categories, such as "Best Supporting Young Actress in a Feature Film", "Best Young Actress Age 10 and Under in a Feature Film", and "Best Leading Young Actress in an International Feature Film", are not included.

Superlative winners/nominees are listed alphabetically.

Winners and nominees
For the first twenty-three ceremonies, due to the numerous "Television" awards also presented by the Young Artist Association, the eligibility period spanned two calendar years to recognize the traditional television season. For example, the 1st Youth in Film Awards, presented in October 1979, recognized performers who appeared on television shows and in feature films that were released between September 1, 1978 and August 31, 1979. Starting with the 24th Young Artist Awards, presented in March 2003, the period of eligibility became the full previous calendar year, from January 1 to December 31, similar to the eligibility requirement used by the Academy Awards.

Following the Young Artist Association's practice, the films below are listed by year of their qualifying run, which is the year the film was released in the United States, and not by the date of the ceremony, which has traditionally taken place the following calendar year beginning with the 10th Youth in Film Awards ceremony which recognized performances during the 1987/1988 season and took place in 1989.

1970s

1980s

1990s

2000s

2010s

See also
Academy Juvenile Award
Broadcast Film Critics Association Award for Best Young Performer
Saturn Award for Best Performance by a Younger Actor
Young Artist Award for Best Leading Young Actor in a Feature Film

References

External links
 
  Young Artist Awards photographs at LIFE.com

Film awards for lead actress
Awards established in 1979
Awards for young actors
Young Artist Awards